Filip Draković (born 31 March 1991 in Murska Sobota) is a Slovenian footballer, playing as goalkeeper for Radomlje in the Slovenian PrvaLiga.

He is currently the acting president of the student organization ŠSS in Ljubljana.

Career
Draković began playing football for the youth selections in 2005 for Mura 05. He became a first choice goalkeeper in the 2011–12 season.

Draković had already been voted the best goalkeeper of the first round, at the beginning of the season.
His transition to first pick was gradual. According to PrvaLiga statistics Drakovič was first pick for the team 16-times in the season 2011–12. Mura 05 ranked third as the PrvaLiga season 2011–12 came to a close, meaning the club qualified for The Europa League qualifications round. In the second leg of the match against FC Baku Draković kept the net intact, guaranteeing the club's progression to the second qualification round, thus earning the title "man of the match".

References

External links
PrvaLiga profile 
Nogomania profile 
UEFA profile
Goal.com profile

1991 births
Living people
People from Murska Sobota
Slovenian footballers
Association football goalkeepers
NK Mura players
ND Mura 05 players
Slovenian PrvaLiga players